The Bʼaga languages, also known as Gumuz, form small language family spoken along the border of Ethiopia and Sudan. They have been tentatively classified as closest to the Koman languages within the Nilo-Saharan language family.

Languages
There are four to five Bʼaga languages. Grammatical forms are distinct between Northern Gumuz and Southern Gumuz. Yaso is at least a divergent dialect, perhaps distinct enough to count as a separate language. Daatsʼiin, discovered in 2013, is closest to Southern Gumuz, while Kadallu in Sudan is attested by only two short word lists.

A comparative word list of Daatsʼiin, Northern Gumuz, and Southern Gumuz is available in Ahland & Kelly (2014).<ref>Ahland, Colleen and Eliza Kelly. 2014. Daatsʼíin-Gumuz Comparative Word list.</ref>

Classification
Dimmendaal (2008) notes that mounting grammatical evidence has made the Nilo-Saharan proposal as a whole more sound since Greenberg proposed it in 1963, but that such evidence has not been forthcoming for Songhay, Koman, and Bʼaga/Gumuz: "very few of the more widespread nominal and verbal morphological markers of Nilo-Saharan are attested in the Coman languages plus Gumuz ... Their genetic status remains debatable, mainly due to lack of more extensive data." (2008:843) And later, "In summarizing the current state of knowledge, ... the following language families or phyla can be identified — ... Mande, Songhai, Ubangian, Kadu, and the Coman languages plus Gumuz." (2008:844)

This "Coman plus Gumuz" is what Greenberg (1963) had subsumed under Koman and what Bender (1989) had called Komuz, a broader family consisting of Gumuz and the Koman languages. However, Bender (2000) separated Gumuz as at least a distinct branch of Nilo-Saharan, and suggested that it might even be a language isolate. Dimmendaal (2000), who tentatively included Koman within Nilo-Saharan, excluded Gumuz as an isolate, as it did not share the tripartite singulative–collective–plurative number system characteristic of the rest of the Nilo-Saharan language families. Ahland (2010, 2012), however, reports that with better attestation, Gumuz does indeed appear to be Nilo-Saharan, and perhaps closest to Koman. It has grammatical forms that resemble what might be expected from an ancestral proto-Nilo-Saharan language. Gumuz may thus help elucidate the family, which is extremely diverse and has been difficult to substantiate.

Dimmendaal, Ahland & Jakobi (2019) summarize earlier work that the evidence "suggests that Gumuz and Koman may indeed form two subgroups within a broader 'Komuz' family" and that "there is some evidence that these two language families may indeed be part of a broader Nilo-Saharan phylum, albeit outliers in the family".

See also
Gumuz word lists (Wiktionary)

Notes

References
 Ahland, Colleen Anne. "The Classification of Gumuz and Koman Languages", presented at the Language Isolates in Africa workshop, Lyons, December 4, 2010
 Lionel Bender, 2000. "Nilo-Saharan". In Bernd Heine and Derek Nurse (eds.), African Languages: An Introduction. Cambridge University Press.
 Dimmendaal, Gerrit J., 2000. "Number marking and noun categorization in Nilo- Saharan languages". Anthrolopological Linguistics 42:214-261.
 Gerrit Dimmendaal, 2008. "Language Ecology and Linguistic Diversity on the African Continent", Language and Linguistics Compass'' 2/5:842.

Further reading 
 video of Colleen Ahland speaking on the classification of Koman and Gumuz

External links 
 Gumuz basic lexicon at the Global Lexicostatistical Database

 
Komuz languages
Language families